Simbi Veke Mubako is the former ambassador of Zimbabwe to the United States. He graduated with a BA degree in political science and history from Roma College, Lesotho.

Mubako attributed Western opposition to the government of Robert Mugabe as a continued campaign by the British government to colonize Zimbabwe.

Mubako and Cynthia McKinney, a representative in the United States House of Representatives, accused supporters of the Zimbabwe Democracy and Economic Recovery Act of 2001 of  racism.

References

Living people
Year of birth missing (living people)
Ambassadors of Zimbabwe to the United States
National University of Lesotho alumni
Members of the National Assembly of Zimbabwe
ZANU–PF politicians